River Nile is one of the 18 wilayat or states of Sudan. It has an area of 122,123 km² (47,152 mi²) and an estimated population of 1,027,534 (2006). It is made up of seven localities.

Localities
Ad-Damir (Capital)
Atbara
Shendi
Berber
Abu Hamed
El Matamah
El Buhaira

References

External links
 en.nahralnileinvest.gov.sd, Ministry of Investment, Industry, Tourism & Mining River Nile State

 
States of Sudan